The Universities of Wales Air Squadron is a University Air Squadron of the Royal Air Force's Volunteer Reserve for students from Cardiff University, Cardiff Metropolitan University, Swansea University, University of Wales Trinity Saint David (formerly Swansea Met), University of South Wales, Glamorgan University, Aberystwyth University and University of Wales, Lampeter. It was founded in 1963.

References

Royal Air Force university air squadrons
Universities in Wales